Philip P. DiStefano (born 1946) is an academic administrator who serves as the current and 11th chancellor of the University of Colorado Boulder since May 2009. He has taught at the University of Colorado, Boulder since 1974, and holds the Quigg and Virginia S. Newton Endowed Leadership chair.

Early life
Philip DiStefano was born and raised in Steubenville, Ohio. He received a Bachelor of Science from the Ohio State University and a Masters of Arts in English from West Virginia University. He later received a Ph.D in humanities from the Ohio State University.

Career
After attaining his master's degree, DiStefano began teaching high school English in Steubenville. In 1974, he joined the University of Colorado in Boulder as an assistant professor in curriculum and instruction, part of the university's School of Education. DiStefano holds the Quigg and Virginia S. Newton Endowed Leadership chair, and he oversees leadership programs at the University of Colorado.

DiStefano has also served as a member and director of several boards throughout his career, including the Association of American Universities, the National Collegiate Athletic Association, North America's Research Universities, Boulder Community Hospital, and the Pac-12 Conference.

Before being appointed as chancellor of the University of Colorado Boulder, DiStefano served two terms as interim chancellor. In May 2009, he was named the 11th chancellor of the university.

Controversies

9/11 essay controversy
In 2001, University of Colorado professor Ward Churchill wrote an essay entitled On the Justice of Roosting Chickens. The essay argued that the September 11 attacks were provoked by U.S. foreign policy. In the essay, Churchill described the role of financial workers at the World Trade Center as an "ongoing genocidal American imperialism" comparable to the role played by Adolf Eichmann in organizing the Holocaust. In 2005, this essay drew attention after Hamilton College invited Churchill to speak. This led to both condemnations of Churchill and counter-accusations of McCarthyism by Churchill and his supporters. Following the controversy, DiStefano, who was serving as interim chancellor, said that "while Professor Churchill has the constitutional right to express his political views, his essay on 9/11 has outraged and appalled us and the general public." A documentary titled Shouting Fire: Stories from the Edge of Free Speech, broadcast on HBO, prominently features Churchill's case in addressing the issues of free speech and First Amendment rights.

Suspension from the University of Colorado
In 2017, DiStefano was suspended without pay for ten days for failing to report domestic abuse allegations against an assistant football coach at the school. Rick George, the athletics director at the University of Boulder, as well as Mike MacIntyre, the football coach, both reportedly shared the allegations with DiStefano, who failed to report them or give the allegations any further attention. George and MacIntyre were both ordered to pay $100,000 to domestic violence charities as a result of these allegations, a punishment that was met with some controversy as their base salaries were more than $2 million. DiStefano donated his ten-day suspension pay to domestic violence charities as well.

Protests against budget cuts
In 2018, DiStefano announced that the budget for the Colorado University student government would be cut by more than 90%, and that $21 million of the $23 million budget would be moved to the Vice Chancellor for Student Affairs. Many student unions  gathered in support of the student government, calling for the removal of DiStefano due to the decision. Further rallies were led by five groups of student union candidates in another, separate campaign.

Response to threats to campus
On 22 March 2021, a mass shooting occurred at a King Soopers supermarket in Boulder. The University of Colorado did not send alerts to notify students and faculty of the shooting until almost three hours after the shooting began. The next year, on 31 January 2022, an 800-page manifesto was published online. The author, who was living close to the University of Colorado campus, threatened members of the University of California, Los Angeles (UCLA) philosophy department, as well as included general references to Boulder and the University of Colorado. UCLA held remote classes on 1 February. The University of Colorado Boulder, however, held classes in person that day and did not send alerts to its students until 10 A.M., nearly two hours after the police became involved. The author of the manifesto was eventually arrested at his home. Following the arrest, a petition was started calling for DiStefano's resignation, citing how out-of-state threats caused enough alarm for UCLA to close campus, but not enough alarm for the University of Colorado, which was under in-state threat. University of Colorado students also cited the university's apparent "lack of care" toward the student body.

Personal life
DiStefano married Yvonne DiStefano in 1969. They have three daughters and two grandchildren.

References

Living people
Ohio State University alumni
West Virginia University alumni
People from Steubenville, Ohio
American academic administrators
1946 births